The comber (Serranus cabrilla) is a species of marine ray-finned fish from the family Serranidae, the sea basses. It is widely distributed in the eastern North and South Atlantic Oceans and into the southwestern Indian Ocean. It is caught for food and fishmeal in some parts of its range.

Description
The comber has a relatively stout body with a large head and a prominent jaw. It has two dorsal fins, the first has 11 thin spines and is joined to the second, which has 13-15 branched rays. The anal fin has 3 spines and 7-8 soft rays. The caudal fin is slightly truncate in shape. The colouration of the comber varies from light brown to dark brown to an intense reddish brown. It is marked with 7 to 9 darker transverse bands along its flanks, these are broken by a longitudinal white to yellowish stripe, running from the head to the tail. There are a few yellow or orange longitudinal lines on the sides of the head. The first dorsal fin is normally folded flat against the back when the fish is in the water. The comber can reach a standard length of  but  fish are more common.

Distribution
The comber has an extensive distribution in the eastern Atlantic where it is found in the warmer waters in the south and southwest of England and off western Wales, south along the European coast, to the Straits of Gibraltar and into the Mediterranean and Black Seas. It also occur along the west coast of Africa from Morocco southwards to Angola. Combers are found around the islands of Macaronesia and São Tomé and Príncipe in the Gulf of Guinea. It also occurs off the coasts of South Africa where it is found from the Cape of Good Hope to KwaZulu-Natal. Records from the Red Sea were thought to be a result of Anti-Lessepsian migration from the Mediterranean via the Suez Canal. However, genetic analysis demonstrated that the Red Sea population must have existed before the opening of the Suez Canal.

Habitat and biology
The comber occurs over the continental shelf and upper continental slope among rocks, Posidonia beds, and where there are substrates of sand and mud. It is a predatory species which feeds mainly on crustaceans. Off the Canary Islands the diet varied with size, the smaller fish consuming more crabs while the larger fish ate carideans. Elsewhere their diet has been recorded as very varied and includes small and immature fish, annelids, squid and they have also been recorded scavenging on dead marine animals.

The comber is a solitary and territorial species. They spawn between May and July, and are hermaphrodites, mature fish having both ovaries and testes. They are capable of being either male or female, and there are known to have been instances of self-fertilisation where fish have been unable to locate a partner for spawning.

Fisheries
The comber is of low commercial value, approximately 1,000 tons are landed from European waters. It is eaten as well as being processed for fishmeal.

References

External links
 Rare Fish Records
 

Comber (fish)
Marine fauna of North Africa
Fish of Western Asia
Fish of the East Atlantic
Fish of the Mediterranean Sea
Fish of the Black Sea
Fish described in 1758
Taxa named by Carl Linnaeus